The Presidential Council was the body that ruled South Yemen from June 23, 1969 to December 27, 1978. Its chairman was the head of state.

Chairmen

Members (in 1970)

Salim Rubai Ali (Chairman)
Muhammad Ali Haithem
Muhammad Saleh Aulaqi
Ali Ahmed Nasser
Abdul Fattah Ismail

Sources
The Europa World Year Book 1970, Volume II, p. 1353

Politics of Yemen
South Yemen
Collective heads of state